The 2003 FIA European Touring Car Championship was the second European Touring Car Championship season.

The season began at Barcelona on 6 April, and finished at Monza after twenty races over ten meetings.

Teams and drivers

Results and standings

Races

Standings

Drivers' Championship

† — Drivers did not finish the race, but were classified as they completed over 90% of the race distance.

References

External links

European Touring Car Championship seasons
European Touring Car Championship
2003 in European sport